André Pelletier (born 23 February 1941) is a former Canadian politician and a two-term Member of the National Assembly of Quebec from 1994 to 2003.

Life
He was a city councillor in Val-d'Or from 1976 to 1980, and then mayor from 1980 to 1992.

He ran successfully as the Parti Québécois candidate in the 1994 Quebec election in Abitibi-Est.  He was re-elected in 1998 election, but he did not run for re-election in the 2003.

References

1941 births
Living people
Mayors of places in Quebec
Parti Québécois MNAs
People from Rouyn-Noranda
People from Val-d'Or
Quebec municipal councillors
21st-century Canadian politicians